Javkhede is a village in Jalgaon district, tehsil Amalner in state of Maharashtra, India. Population of Javkhede is about 5,000.

It is situated on banks of a nullah. It lies on Border of Dhule and Jalgaon districts and located between villages Mohadi and Vavade.

Majority of people speak Ahirani language (a dialect of Marathi). Most of the people in this village are farmers. The popular crops are cotton, Bajra, wheat, groundnut etc.
Javkhede was awarded 'Adarsh gaon' (Ideal village) on national level by a trust headed by noted social activist Anna Hazare for work on irrigation and water conservation.

Javkhede is famous for 'Gaadipeeth of Dutta' (a Hindu God). The biggest festival of this village is 'Datta Jayanti'. On this Day a religious procession is held in the village. A lot of Devotees come to pray on this occasion.

Geography 
It has average elevation of 217 metres (712 feet).

References 

Villages in Jalgaon district